Transport in Greater Kuala Lumpur includes a road network, a railway network, airports, and other modes of public transport. The Klang Valley is an urban conglomeration consisting of the city of Kuala Lumpur, as well as surrounding towns and cities in the state of Selangor. The Klang Valley has the country's largest airport, the Kuala Lumpur International Airport (KLIA), as well as the country's largest intermodal transport hub and railway station, Kuala Lumpur Sentral.

There are multiple modes of public transport, including buses, rail, taxis, and motor-taxis, serving the region. However Kuala Lumpur, with a population of 1.79 million in the city and six million in its metropolitan area, is experiencing the effects and challenges of rapid urbanisation and urban planning issues. To resolve these issues, the Kuala Lumpur City Hall (DBKL) has plans to initiate programmes that would improve the public transportation system and increase its sustainability and decrease its environmental impact in the Klang Valley. The Kuala Lumpur Structure Plan 2020, in particular, intends to address the unprecedented growth and changes in Kuala Lumpur's urban transportation landscape.

History of public transport in Kuala Lumpur
In the 19th century and early 20th century, most Kuala Lumpur citizens and tin miners used rickshaws, elephants, sampans, and bull- or horse-drawn carriages as basic public transportation (as in transport by means not owned by persons being transported).

From the 1960s to the 1990s, the Mini-Bus Service or Bas Mini was popular.

Regulation
The public transport system is regulated by various authorities, including the Commercial Vehicle Licensing Board (CVLB) of the Ministry of Entrepreneur and Co-operative Development, the Ministry of Transport and local governments such as the Dewan Bandaraya Kuala Lumpur and the other city and municipal councils.

There is no single body that regulates the whole sector.

The Integration and Restructuring of the Public Transport System in the Klang Valley (Inspak) steering committee, established in July 2003, is tasked with encouraging greater use of public transportation to reduce traffic congestion and initiate the establishment of the Klang Valley Urban Transport Authority as the regulatory authority for public transportation in the Klang Valley. Little has been said about the establishment of this authority ever since.

Rapid KL was established in 2004 by the Ministry of Finance to provide an integrated public transport system in the Klang Valley incorporating rail and bus services as part of Inspak. It holds quasi-regulatory powers in the sense that unlike other bus operators, it has much greater freedom to set its routes. Furthermore, its fare structure differs from that set by the CVLB.

By 2007, passengers have access to Touch 'n Go ticketing system on RapidKL systems, KL Monorail, and KTM Komuter.

Cycling

Rail

Klang Valley Integrated Transit System

The Klang Valley Integrated Transit System currently consists of three light rapid transit (LRT) lines, two commuter rail lines, one monorail line, one bus rapid transit line, two mass rapid transit (MRT) line and three airport rail links, two to the Kuala Lumpur International Airport and one to the Sultan Abdul Aziz Shah Airport. The LRT lines connect the city centre with major suburbs like Petaling Jaya, Subang Jaya, Gombak, Puchong and Bukit Jalil around the city centre. The MRT and commuter rail lines link the city centre with other major towns and cities outside the city such as Shah Alam, Petaling Jaya, Klang, Rawang, Kepong, Kajang, Sungai Buloh and others. The monorail serves various locations in the city centre. Several interchanging stations integrate these rail services. Several railway stations are also served by the intercity KTM ETS service, which connects the Klang Valley with other states and regions in Peninsular Malaysia.

Light rapid transit (LRT) 

There are three fully grade-separated light rapid transit (LRT) systems in the Klang Valley, the Kelana Jaya Line, Sri Petaling Line and Ampang Line, The lines function as light metro services are all operated by Rapid Rail.

The Kelana Jaya Line links the city centre with the major towns and cities of Subang Jaya, Petaling Jaya and Gombak. To date, it carries over 170,000 passengers a day. At  in length, the Kelana Jaya Line is the second-longest fully automated driverless metro system in Malaysia.

The Sri Petaling Line extends from the city centre towards the south of Kuala Lumpur and through Puchong, before meeting the Kelana Jaya Line at their common terminus station, Putra Heights. The Ampang Line serves the eastern part of Kuala Lumpur as well as Ampang. These two lines carry over 130,000 to 150,000 per day on a weekday basis and an average of 120,000 per day on weekends.

A fourth LRT line is currently under construction which will connect Bandar Utama with Klang through the city of Shah Alam. T Bandar Utama-Klang Line will be connected to the Klang Valley Integrated Transit System through interchange stations with the Kelana Jaya Line, Kajang Line and Port Klang Line, allow commuters from Kuala Lumpur to travel as far as Shah Alam and Klang on the western side of Selangor.

All LRT lines run on standard-gauge tracks.

Mass rapid transit (MRT) 

The Klang Valley currently has two mass rapid transit (MRT) line, the Kajang Line and Putrajaya Line. The Kajang Line provides high-capacity metro services between the city and the outer parts of the Klang Valley. The lines run from Kwasa Damansara to Kajang, running through the city centre. The line is owned by MRT Corp but is also operated by Rapid Rail, and functions as part of the Rapid KL system.

A second MRT line, the Putrajaya Line, is currently halfway operation which, once complete, will run from Kwasa Damansara to Putrajaya, pass through the city centre. It will provide rail transport to southern Kuala Lumpur and Seri Kembangan before terminating at Putrajaya. It will also be the second rail link from Kuala Lumpur to Putrajaya, the country's administrative capital, after the Express Rail Link lines.

A third MRT line, which is the Circle Line, has been approved and would form a loop line of the integrated transit system in the Klang Valley region. It is expected to stretch from Bukit Kiara South to University of Malaya while forming the loop and will also include densely populated areas outside of the city centre.

Commuter rail 

Commuter rail in the Klang Valley is mainly operated by Keretapi Tanah Melayu (KTM). It operates three lines in the Klang Valley, namely the Port Klang Line, Seremban Line, and Skypark Link. All three lines integrate at KL Sentral, the largest railway station and intermodal transportation hub in Malaysia, which is also served by other rapid transit lines. The commuter lines provide long-distance rail transport to the outer fringes of the Klang Valley, as well Batu Caves, Shah Alam, Petaling Jaya and Klang in Selangor. The Seremban Line travels south as far as Pulau Sebang in Malacca, while the Port Klang Line extends to Tanjung Malim in Perak. The Skypark Link functions as an airport rail link from the city centre to the Sultan Abdul Aziz Shah Airport (Subang Airport) in Subang.

The KTM Komuter system is the only rail system in the Klang Valley which runs on metre-gauge tracks. The KTM Komuter shares the same tracks with the KTM ETS, providing interchanges with the inter-city rail service.

Airport rail links 

Express airport rail link is provided by both the Skypark Link to the Subang Airport, as well as the KLIA Ekspres line operated by Express Rail Link (ERL) to the Kuala Lumpur International Airport (KLIA). The KLIA Ekspress provides non-stop service between KL Sentral and KLIA, without stopping in any of the stations in between. The trains run on 15-minute intervals during peak hours and 20-minute intervals during off-peak hours.

The KLIA Transit line shares the same tracks as the KLIA Ekspres. Also operated by ERL, KLIA Transit stops at all stations between KL Sentral and KLIA, providing commuter rail service apart from a rail link from the city centre to the airport. The ERL lines are currently the only rail link between Kuala Lumpur and Putrajaya.

The Skypark Link, KLIA Transit, and KLIA Ekspres share a common terminus at KL Sentral station, allowing passengers to transfer between the airports using the rail lines.

While the KTM Komuter system uses metre-gauge tracks, the ERL system uses standard-gauge tracks.

Monorail

Previously operated by KL Infrastructure Group, the monorail service in Kuala Lumpur serves as a people mover system within the city. It connects the KL Sentral transport hub with the Golden Triangle area of Kuala Lumpur. Since November 2007, the monorail service has been taken over by Prasarana Malaysia and merged into the Rapid KL network.

Inter-city rail

KTM Electric Train Service (ETS) 

The main Inter-city rail service in Malaysia is provided by Keretapi Tanah Melayu (KTM), which operates the KTM ETS service. KTM ETS operates along the KTM West Coast railway line, between Padang Besar in Perlis and Gemas in Negeri Sembilan. Almost all KTM ETS services originate or run through the Kuala Lumpur Sentral station (KL Sentral) and connects the city centre with all the states along the West Coast of Peninsular Malaysia.

At Padang Besar, the West Coast line connects with the Thai railway network operated by the State Railway of Thailand. At Gemas, the railway line is connected with the KTM East Coast railway line. The West Coast line terminates at the Woodlands Train Checkpoint in Singapore. The East Coast line, as well as the remaining southern portion of the West Coast line, is served by KTM Intercity, another inter-city rail service also operated by KTM, providing rail transport to the East Coast states and Johor, and crossing the international border into Singapore. KTM Intercity and KTM ETS interchange at Gemas station.

The railway lines are built on the metre gauge. The line between Padang Besar and Gemas is double-tracked and electrified, while the southern part of the West Coast line as well as the entire East Coast line is single-tracked and not electrified, allowing on diesel hauled trains to run on them.

Double tracking and electrification works of the southern portion of the West Coast line between Gemas and Johor Bahru are currently underway. Once completed, the KTM ETS system will be expanded to the south, connecting Kuala Lumpur and the Klang Valley with the entire West Coast rail line.

Kuala Lumpur–Singapore High-Speed Rail

Plans are underway to construct Asia's first transnational high-speed rail system (HSR) between Kuala Lumpur and Singapore.

Buses

The Kuala Lumpur Mini Bus service is one of the oldest bus services in Malaysia and commenced operation in 1975. The Klang Valley's bus service was rather poor compared to other cities around the world before the bus network revamp, resulting in only 16% of the total population in Klang Valley using public transport.

On 1 December 2015, the Land Public Transport Agency (formerly SPAD) under the Ministry of Transport revamped the bus network. Through this exercise, all bus routes were reorganised into 8 smaller corridors based on the main trunk roads connecting Kuala Lumpur's city center. In total, 8 stage bus corridors were introduced, namely the Ampang Corridor, Cheras Corridor, Sungai Besi Corridor, Klang Lama Corridor, Lebuhraya Persekutuan Corridor, Damansara Corridor, Jalan Ipoh Corridor, and Jalan Pahang Corridor were revamped under the Klang Valley region.

Rapid Bus is the largest single operator of the bus network in Malaysia. Bus fare varies with bus operator, where Rapid Bus uses a cashless system and other operators uses cash system. Within the city centre, Rapid Bus also operates eight free GoKL City Bus lines.

On 18 June 2020, Rapid Bus released new features on real time locations of bus in Google Maps, via collaboration with Google Transit. Almost 170 RapidKL's bus routes are covered with this real time feature. Rapid Bus also had been expanded the application to MRT feeder bus service, Rapid Penang, and Rapid Kuantan by 2022, passengers can check the real time location via the kiosk website or the PULSE application.

Several bus operators operate in Kuala Lumpur, linking the city centre with the suburbs of the Klang Valley. The main operator is Prasarana's subsidiaries of Rapid Bus, who took over the operations of the two main bus operators, Intrakota and Cityliner.

Other operators include MARA Liner, Selangor Omnibus, Causeway Link and Wawasan Sutera.

Klang Valley
Buses in Klang Valley are run by many transport operators and have many uses. There are nine stage bus operators within the Klang Valley, including Kuala Lumpur, which together operate about 3,200 stage buses.

Local buses
Local buses (not to be confused with Rapid KL's Local Shuttle) or stage buses are run by the integrated network operator Rapid KL as well as privately owned MARA Liner, Causeway Link, Len Seng, Selangor Omnibus, Cityliner (KKBB), Wawasan Sutera, Nadi Putra, and KR Travel and Tours.

Metrobus and Rapid KL are the two main bus companies within the boundaries of Kuala Lumpur from 2006 to 2015. As there is no difference between public transport in Kuala Lumpur and public transport for the whole Klang Valley, most of the other bus companies other than Rapid KL and Metrobus are normally confined to Klang Valley areas that are outside the boundaries of Kuala Lumpur.

The largest operator, Rapid KL, operates more than 170 bus routes along with the Ampang Line, Sri Petaling Line, Kelana Jaya Line, Kajang Line and Putrajaya Line.

Bus stops

There are several major bus stops in Kuala Lumpur.

Important bus interchange

List of City bus interchanges:
HAB Lebuh Pudu (Formerly Kotaraya / Mydin at Jalan Silang / Sinar Kota / Metrojaya; Near Puduraya)
HAB Pasar Seni (Formerly Terminal Jalan Sultan Mohammad, or known as Bus Stand Klang or Pasaramakota)
Hub Medan Pasar (Serve for Jalan Ipoh Corridor & Jalan Pahang Corridor Bus), most of the bus will start their journey at BSN Jalan Ampang near Masjid Jamek station
HAB Titiwangsa bus (Rapid KL and GoKL buses) - Interchange with Ampang Line, Sri Petaling Line and KL Monorail
LRT / KTM / ERL Bandar Tasik Selatan or Terminal Bersepadu Selatan
Klang Utara Bus Station near Mydin Klang

Express and long-distance buses: (to other states in Malaysia including Singapore and Southern Thailand
Pudu Sentral (for Seremban, Tanjung Malim and Teluk Intan routes)
Hentian Duta (mainly serve northern region)
Terminal Bersepadu Selatan (TBS)
Pekeliling Bus Terminal (for Genting Highlands, Bentong, Raub, Kuala Lipis, Mentakab and Temerloh routes)

The old and former bus interchanges and terminals:
Pasaramakota bus station (Demolished by MRT Corp built for MRT Pasar Seni)
Terminal Putra (Defunct)

Stage bus operators

Rapid KL by Rapid Bus

Rapid Bus is the largest bus operator in the Klang Valley. Currently, there are more than 200 routes, which integrates with Klang Valley's Rail Systems. The bus routes operated by Rapid Bus were previously operated by Intrakota Komposit Sdn Bhd, a subsidiary of DRB-HICOM Bhd; and Cityliner Sdn Bhd, a subsidiary of Park May Bhd. In 2005, Rapid KL buses carried around 190,000 passengers daily. Many of the other bus companies listed here including Metrobus are slowly being phased out and being defunct or unpopular with commuters.

On 18 June 2020, Rapid Bus released new features on real time locations of bus in Google Maps, via collaboration with Google Transit. All the bus routes operated by Rapid Bus are covered with this real time feature including MRT feeder bus service and two other cities.

Selangor Omnibus Co.

Established in 1937, Selangor Omnibus is the oldest company in Malaysia, starting its operation between Kuala Lumpur and Kuala Selangor, connecting the northwest and the city centre of Kuala Lumpur. Its famous red and white coloured bus makes it easily recognisable by passengers travelling towards Kuala Selangor. Since then, Selangor Omnibus started covering the northwest rural areas such as Bestari Jaya, Ijok, Paya Jaras, Kepong and Jinjang. Until today, Selangorbus has covered almost 20 northern areas with 6 routes, using combination of new and old buses.

Setara Jaya Bus (SJ Bus) 
Setara Jaya Bus were established in 1989, connecting Tanjung Malim, Rawang, Selayang and Kuala Lumpur areas, using second-hand buses purchased from Rapid KL. The bus company was shut down in 2022 and the service routes is taken over by MARA Liner.

Cityliner by Konsortium TransNasional

Konsortium Transnasional Berhad (KTB) is the largest private stage bus operator in Malaysia, serving people in states namely Kedah, Penang, Pahang, Kelantan, Negeri Sembilan, and Selangor. With a fleet of more than 700 buses, ranging from mini to double-decker, the red and grey signature colour of Cityliner has been a major mode of transport, connecting rural and urban areas, villages to towns ferrying thousands of passengers every day of the year. From school-going children to housewives buying groceries and workers commuting to work, with trips schedule tailored to the local needs, Cityliner has become part of daily life for many Malaysians.

Cityliner has pioneered the stage bus industry with many firsts. With the rising environmental concerns and increasing fuel prices, Cityliner was the first in the country to opt for Compressed Natural Gas (CNG) technology which allows the buses to run on an alternative source of fuel commonly known as Natural Gas.

Cityliner was also the first in Klang Valley to introduce double-decker stage buses. The additional seating capacity enables Cityliner to carry a double number of passengers of a single deck at one time thus making it the most efficient among the stage bus providers.

The high debt in Kuala Lumpur's Cityliner company, Kenderaan Klang-Banting Berhad results in termination of the company in Kuala Lumpur, resulting some routes were either transferred to other company such as Seranas or Wawasan Sutera, or terminated.

Len Seng

Len Seng Omnibus was formed in the early 60s, covering routes to Ampang Jaya, Setapak and Wangsa Maju. After revamped the routes by SPAD, the company mainly serves the Wangsa Maju areas of bus services 252 (Seksyen 10 Wangsa Maju - Hub Munshi Abdullah). Due to competition on Rapid Bus services 251 (Jentayu AU3 - Seksyen 10 Wangsa Maju - Chow Kit) and T251 (LRT Sri Rampai - Seksyen 10 Wangsa Maju), the services became unpopular, resulting in termination of the services.

Nadi Putra
Founded in 1999, Nadi Putra is a bus service that is owned by Perbadanan Putrajaya. It operates mainly around Putrajaya and Cyberjaya, as well as trunk buses that link from Putrajaya to Kuala Lumpur, Bandar Saujana Putra and Seri Kembangan.

Since the company took over by GETS Global Berhad in 2018, the service quality has declined, much of the buses were left abandoned due to poor maintenance and service. During the lockdown in 2020 and until 31 December 2022, Nadi Putra abandoned or terminated the outer trunk routes where two of the routes were transferred to KR Travel and Tours, while some of the Putrajaya routes were operated using 15 KBES Foton express bus with the minimal frequency. Beginning January 2023, Putrajaya Corporation returned to operate Nadi Putra bus service with new revamped routes operated by Rapid Bus.

Causeway Link

Causeway Link was founded in 2003 and is based in Johor Bahru, Johor. Apart from its services in Johor and Singapore, the company mainly serves the areas in Port Klang, Klang and Puchong, Selangor. The company has previously served in the Kepong and Segambut areas of Kuala Lumpur until its transfer to Selangor Omnibus in July 2017. It also operates Smart Selangor Free Bus service in Sepang District.

Wawasan Sutera 

Established in 2004 as an express bus service to airports, Wawasan Sutera started its operation from Klang to Kuala Selangor in 2009. The company begin took over the CityLiner routes in Banting, as some routes still shows demand of passengers travelling to some areas in Banting and Klang. As of today, there were 8 routes mainly serve around Klang and Banting areas.

KR Travel and Tours (KRTT) 

Founded in 2002, KR Travel and Tours began its operation with tour coach and factory bus services. The company began to operate stagebus service to Klang Valley with takeover of CityLiner route 732 from KLIA to Banting. Until today, KRTT has 2 routes in Klang Valley, connecting Putrajaya areas to Serdang and Kuala Lumpur and Banting to KLIA, marketed as Airport Liner. The company also operates MyBas (Airport Liner) routes from Nilai to KLIA via Bandar Baru Salak Tinggi and Nilai to Sungai Pelek, as well the free shuttle bus for the Long-Term Car Park (LTCP) in KLIA.

Klang Valley Bus Network Revamp
The Klang Valley Bus Network Revamp or 'Greater Kuala Lumpur Bus Network Revamp (BNR) is a plan implemented by Land Public Transport Commission (SPAD) in Klang Valley and Greater Kuala Lumpur of Malaysia, starting from 1 December 2015.

This plan aims to improve the stage bus services in these areas by providing commuters with higher bus service frequency that covers a wider area, which will subsequently improve its reliability.

Under this system, existing bus corridors were reorganized into eight bus corridors:
Ampang Corridor
Cheras Corridor
Damansara Corridor
Jalan Ipoh Corridor
Jalan Pahang Corridor
Klang Lama Corridor
Lebuhraya Persekutuan Corridor
Sungai Besi Corridor

Taxis

Teksi Bermeter
Taxis have been a common sight in Kuala Lumpur ever since the 1950s, and in the 1970s and 1980s, the Morris Oxford was a common model used as a taxi. Metered taxis (Malay: Teksi Bermeter) can be hailed throughout the city. However, traffic jams are fairly common in KL, especially during rush hour, and it might be difficult to get a taxi at that time. There have been many instances of taxi drivers charging extravagant fares, especially for tourists, who are therefore advised to travel in taxis which charge fares according to a meter, and insist that the meter is used.

Taxi stands are available around the city and most taxis will stop at the taxi stand. Taxis in Kuala Lumpur are coloured in various colours such as a combination of red-white, red, yellow-blue, green, or yellow. However, taxis could be easily recognised as the taxis' vehicle registration number carries a prefix H for normal taxis and LIMO for an airport limousine.

Motor-Taxis
Fixed rate and metered motorcycle-taxi or "motor-taxi" can now be found in and utilized by KL citizens as well as tourists since its introduction on Nov 16, 2016.

Transit hubs

Intercity travel
For intercity travel, the main transit hubs in Kuala Lumpur are:
 Pudu Sentral — an intercity bus terminal located in the city centre. A new bus terminal, Plaza Rakyat is planned to replace neighbouring Pudu Sentral. However, the construction has been halted indefinitely. There are an LRT and MRT station nearby that connects to the building. Express buses to airports still operates at this terminal.
 KL Sentral — Kuala Lumpur's main railway station and bus hubs for shuttles to Genting Highlands, KLIA and klia2.
 Pekeliling Bus Terminal  — the combination of local and express buses to Genting Highlands, Bentong, Raub, Kuala Lipis, Jerantut and Temerloh.
 Duta Bus Terminal — for buses operated by Transnasional, Airport Coach (bus services to KLIA) and northern express bus.
 Terminal Bersepadu Selatan - The newest transport hub in the Klang Valley, replaced Pudu Sentral as the major hub for all intercity buses in the Klang Valley. Connecting with KTM Seremban Line, KTM ETS, KLIA Transit & LRT Sri Petaling Line.

Local rail transport
 KL Sentral — a modern multi-modal transport hub served by KTM Komuter, KTM ETS, LRT, MRT, ERL, monorail as well as local buses, airport buses to the KLIA, shuttle bus to Genting Highlands and several intercity buses
 Masjid Jamek — an LRT interchange between the LRT Kelana Jaya Line, LRT Ampang Line & LRT Sri Petaling Lines.
 Bandar Tasik Selatan station — a train interchange between the LRT Sri Petaling Line, KTM Seremban Line, KTM ETS, and ERL KLIA Transit.
 Pasar Seni — an MRT/LRT interchange between the LRT Kelana Jaya Line and MRT Kajang Lines.

Local bus terminals
KL Sentral, Titiwangsa, KLCC, Maluri, and Medan Pasar form Rapid KL's bus interchanges in the city. Meanwhile, private bus operators are mostly based at the Jalan Tun Tan Cheng Lock (formerly known as Jalan Cheng Lock) area which includes Pasaramakota, Central Market, Bangkok Bank, Medan Pasar, Kotaraya, Sinar Kota and Puduraya.  Several suburban bus hubs serve as terminals and interchanges.

Legacy terminals
Traditionally, most bus services, whether local or intercity originated from the city centre, especially in the areas around Jalan Tun Tan Cheng Lock. Recently transport operators have decided to unilaterally move operations elsewhere. For example, executive bus operators, especially those headed for Singapore, have switched to less congested locations like the Kuala Lumpur Railway Station, KL Sentral, Bangsar and Petaling Jaya. Rapid KL itself has shifted operations to its city hubs. The government meanwhile has been encouraging buses to use other newer terminals like Pasarakyat and Duta Bus Terminal.

The Kuala Lumpur Railway Station ceased to serve intercity trains in 2001 when operations shifted to neighbouring KL Sentral. However, many other operations such as KTM Komuter services and postal services by Pos Malaysia are still maintained there.

Intermodal hubs
There are various intermodal transport hubs in Kuala Lumpur, with one major intermodal transport hub in the city centre of Kuala Lumpur, the Kuala Lumpur Sentral transport hub.

Kuala Lumpur Sentral

Kuala Lumpur Sentral (KL Sentral) or Sentral Kuala Lumpur is a transit-oriented development that houses the main railway station of Kuala Lumpur, which has officially taken over the role of Kuala Lumpur Railway Station. It is the largest railway station in Southeast Asia.

Stesen Sentral is designated the transport hub within its KL Sentral development project, although both the public and connected transit lines generally refer to the station itself as "KL Sentral". Among rail lines in Kuala Lumpur, Kelana Jaya Line, KL Monorail, KTM Komuter, KTM Intercity, KLIA Ekspres and KLIA Transit integrate in this railway station.

Located within Stesen Sentral, the KL City Air Terminal (KL CAT) is virtually an extension of the Kuala Lumpur International Airport. KL CAT also has luggage check-in services. Currently, only passengers flying Malaysia Airlines, Cathay Pacific, Emirates, and Royal Brunei Airlines can check-in their luggage at KL CAT. KL Sentral has also been made a city bus hub by RapidKL under its bus network revamp.

Pudu Sentral

Puduraya, now known as Pudu Sentral was the main bus terminus for Kuala Lumpur. Long-distance buses arrive and leave from Puduraya for all over Malaysia. Under Kuala Lumpur 2020 Structural Plan, there are plans to move some bus operators to inter-regional hubs in other parts of Kuala Lumpur such as Hentian Duta, Gombak Hub, and Bandar Tasik Selatan hub to avoid massive congestion in Puduraya. Pudu Sentral is accessible via Ampang Line, at Plaza Rakyat Station

Roads

Roads are the major arteries of Kuala Lumpur's transport network. The road network system in Kuala Lumpur is similar to the city road network system in major Chinese cities, where it has ring roads. The main ring roads in Kuala Lumpur are Kuala Lumpur Inner Ring Road, Kuala Lumpur Middle Ring Road 1, and Kuala Lumpur Middle Ring Road 2. Roads in Kuala Lumpur are usually 3 lanes in each direction, and certain roads such as Jalan Sultan Ismail and Jalan Bukit Bintang are one-way streets.

Expressways
Expressways in Kuala Lumpur are tolled roads. They serve as an alternative during peak periods at which time some parts of Kuala Lumpur's ring roads become highly congested. Kuala Lumpur is well connected by many intracity expressways such as the Ampang–Kuala Lumpur Elevated Highway. Moreover, Kuala Lumpur is the home for the world's first SMART Tunnel, which is a unique solution to Kuala Lumpur's long-term traffic problems and floodwater mitigation woes.

Most expressways in Kuala Lumpur adopt an open toll collection system. NKVE is the only closed toll system in Klang Valley. In the open toll system, the user pays the toll at each toll plaza, while for the closed toll system, the tolls are to be paid at the toll plazas when exiting the expressway. Payment options includes cash, stored value card Touch 'n Go or the electronic toll collection system SmartTAG.

Access from the city to the surrounding areas is facilitated by a series of expressways that are both integrated and complex. From the city centre to the south-western areas, access is provided mainly from Federal Highway which connects the city to Klang and bridging Petaling Jaya, Subang Jaya, Kelana Jaya and Shah Alam. New Pantai Expressway provides an alternative route to Subang Jaya, bypassing the morning and evening traffic congestion on the Federal Highway. An alternative connection to Shah Alam, Subang Jaya, and Klang is provided by New Klang Valley Expressway which connects with the Sprint Expressway. This connects the city centre to Damansara, to the west. The New Klang Valley Expressway also provides connections to Sungai Buloh and Kepong and is linked to the northern section of the North–South Expressway, which provides access to northern states like Perak, Penang and Kedah. The connection from Damansara in the northwest to Puchong in the south-west of Kuala Lumpur is facilitated by Damansara–Puchong Expressway, which also provides a connection to Putrajaya.

Access from the city centre to southern areas is provided by Sungai Besi Expressway, which leads to the Bukit Jalil and Sungai Besi areas. The highway runs in parallel with the Kuala Lumpur–Seremban Expressway. The highway also provides an alternative route to Kajang by connecting with Kajang Dispersal Link Expressway.

Access from the city centre to south-eastern areas is provided by Cheras Highway which connects to Cheras. The highway is connected with Cheras–Kajang Expressway, which provides access to Kajang and that highway itself is connected with Kajang–Seremban Highway and Kajang Dispersal Link Expressway, giving alternative access to Seremban and southern parts of the city.

The connection from the city centre to eastern areas is provided by Ampang–Kuala Lumpur Elevated Highway. The highway is connected to Kuala Lumpur Middle Ring Road 2 for access to Batu Caves and Gombak. Near Karak Expressway, it provides access to the east coast area of Malaysia. There is no dedicated highway leading from the city centre to the northern areas such as Batu Caves However, Jalan Kuching is the main road from the city to the northern area.

The MMR2 connects with KESAS Highway which provides yet another alternative route to Shah Alam and Subang Jaya. The KESAS highway also has connections to Kuala Lumpur–Seremban Expressway which integrates with the southern section of North–South Expressway and North–South Expressway Central Link which provide access to Kuala Lumpur International Airport.

The connection from the city to Putrajaya is facilitated by a direct highway, Kuala Lumpur–Putrajaya Expressway which also provide connections to Kuala Lumpur International Airport through North–South Expressway Central Link. The highway also provides alternative access to southern areas of the city such as Puchong and Bukit Jalil.

Below is a non-exhaustive list of expressway serving the Klang Valley area:

Airports

The first airport in Kuala Lumpur, Simpang Airport, commenced operations in 1952 and was the main airport for Malaysia until 1965. In 1965, the Subang International Airport became the main international airport in Kuala Lumpur and Malaysia until 1998, before being taken over by the new constructed Kuala Lumpur International Airport (KLIA) in Sepang. The Simpang Airport was taken over by and converted into an air-base for the Royal Malaysian Air Force, while the Subang Airport (renamed Sultan Abdul Aziz Shah Airport) was repurposed as a general aviation and low-cost carrier airport.

Kuala Lumpur is the main gateway for Malaysia as it has the country biggest airport, Kuala Lumpur International Airport, about 25 million passengers used the airport, making it the busiest airport in Malaysia.

The city is served by 2 airports, which is Kuala Lumpur International Airport and Sultan Abdul Aziz Shah Airport(formerly. Subang International Airport). Both airports have international connections, but Sultan Abdul Aziz Shah Airport is solely for turboprop aircraft and private jets only. Kuala Lumpur International Airport apart from being the main passenger gateway, it is also the main cargo destination in Malaysia by cargo traffic.
Kuala Lumpur International Airport is linked to the city centre by KLIA Express by railway, major expressways, and bus service. Subang Airport, meanwhile, is well connected by road networks and bus service.

Kuala Lumpur International Airport (KLIA) is capable of handling 35 million passengers and 1.2 million tonnes of cargo a year in its current phase. It is currently ranked as the 13th busiest airport in the world by international passenger traffic where it has handled 24,129,748 passengers in the year 2006. In the same year, it is also ranked 30th busiest airport in the world by cargo traffic where it has handled 677 446 metric tonnes of cargo. Kuala Lumpur International Airport is one of the only few airports in East Asia to have links to South America, where Malaysia Airlines, has flights out of Kuala Lumpur International Airport to Buenos Aires via Johannesburg and Cape Town.

Both airports are operated by Malaysia Airports and are the hub for Malaysia Airlines, Malaysia Airlines Cargo, AirAsia and AirAsia X in Kuala Lumpur International Airport and Firefly, Transmile Air Services and Berjaya Air in Subang Airport. Moreover, KLIA is also the stopover point for the kangaroo route for Malaysia Airlines.

Ports

Port Klang is one of the main sea ports of Malaysia, located in the district of Klang in the state of Selangor. It serves the Klang Valley, including the federal capital Kuala Lumpur and federal administrative capital Putrajaya.

Port Klang was originally known as Port Swettenham when it was founded under British colonial rule in 1893, after the then British Resident High Commissioner for the Malay State, Sir Frank Swettenham. The official opening of the port was on 15 September 1901, which developed as a new port after a study found that its coastal area had a harbour with deep anchorage, free from dangers, and very suitable for wharves. Its development was accelerated further with the extension of a railway line from Kuala Lumpur to the new port. The Port Klang Authority, established 1 July 1963, administers the three ports in the Port Klang area: Northport, Southpoint and West Port. As of November 2007, West Port, part of the three ports in Port Klang, has handled  worth of containerised cargo, and is moving towards its  by end of 2007. Together with North port and South port, Port Klang handled  of containerised cargo and 133.5 million tonnes of conventional cargo in 2007.

Apart from cargo ships, Port Klang also features a cruise ship terminal in Westport where SuperStar Virgo and Queen Mary 2, the world's second-largest passenger ship has docked in the terminal for an excursion. Port Klang is also the home port of call for SuperStar Gemini.

Port Klang has its free zone, called Port Klang Free Zone (PKFZ). It is an integrated  international cargo distribution and consolidation centre situated in Port Klang, the world's 13th-ranked port in 2005 in terms of throughput volume. The PKFZ is designed to promote entrepot trade and manufacturing industries involved in producing goods primarily for export. In 2007, PKFZ Authority has secured US$220 million and projected to secure another US$184 million in 2008. The project is similar to Dubai's Jebel Ali Free Zone, which previously PKFZ is managed by Jebel Ali Free Zone Authority (JAFZA).

Port Klang is well connected by road and railway networks. On the rail, Port Klang is connected by Keretapi Tanah Melayu, whereas by road, Port Klang is connected by Federal Highway and Shah Alam Expressway

Recent efforts 
Recent efforts on urban transportation design address both the functional and aesthetic aspects of the city's built environment. The Kuala Lumpur Structure Plan 2020 particularly cites good transportation linkage as essential factors to the success of the city, noting that public transportation would enable greater flexibility and movement. For the residents of Kuala Lumpur, it is important to provide a transportation structure that allows members of the community to equal accessibility. The KLCH recognizes “low public transport modal share” as the key problem to high demands on road infrastructure and traffic congestion.

To increase public transportation usage, KLCH is currently expanding and constructing the Mass Rapid Transit lines that would provide more coverage to areas within the conurbation. Additional attention to the design of the newest public transport facilities is made to accommodate individuals with special needs. Also, to avoid traffic congestion occurring on local streets, major bus and rail interchange stops will be strategically located at points of intersections of major roads.
Recent studies also show that people of Klang Valley are willing to use public transport system if it is efficient and comfortable 
However, this shift is highly impacted by peers pressure (subjective norm).

On 18 June 2020, RapidKL's subsidiary Rapid Bus released new features on real time locations of bus in Google Maps, via collaboration with Google Transit. Almost 170 RapidKL's bus routes are covered with this real time feature. Rapid Bus also plans to expand the application to MRT feeder bus service, Rapid Penang, and Rapid Kuantan in the future.

Future Projects

Plaza Rakyat

Plaza Rakyat is a mixed-use skyscraper complex initiated during the 1990s that was to be completed but was halted due to the 1997 Asian financial crisis. The building was intended to replace Puduraya bus depot and also to provide better connectivity to Ampang Line's Plaza Rakyat LRT station. Minor demolition works on the abandoned site started back in 2020 and currently being revived by Kuala Lumpur City Hall.

Multi Lane Free Flow 
By 2008, expressways in Kuala Lumpur will introduce Multi-Lane Free Flow system similar to SmartTAG. Trails of the system is expected to be run starting November 2008 with the Sungai Pencala Toll Plaza on the Damansara–Puchong Expressway(LDP) as the test site. Shah Alam toll plaza as also been selected as a new test site for the system beginning December 2008.|This system will implement in 2010 by stages

Bandar Tasik Selatan integrated transport hub

The Bandar Tasik Selatan station will be upgraded to an integrated transport hub. It is expected to serve buses coming from the south of Kuala Lumpur. Construction has started since November 2007 and expected to complete by 2010. Currently, the station serves Ampang Line, Rawang-Seremban Route of the KTM Komuter and KLIA Ekspres line.

See also
 Transport in Malaysia
 Kuala Lumpur–Singapore High Speed Rail
 Kuala Lumpur Mini-Bus Service
 List of bus routes in Greater Kuala Lumpur
 Kuala Lumpur–Singapore High-Speed Rail

References

External links
 Rapid KL Official Website

 
Transport in Kuala Lumpur

Bus transport in Malaysia
Klang Valley